Wierzyca Pelpin is a football club based in Pelpin (Poland). They play in Poland III Liga.

References

External links
 Official Website 

Association football clubs established in 1955
1955 establishments in Poland
Tczew County
Football clubs in Pomeranian Voivodeship